Karitas Tómasdóttir (born 19 September 1995) is an Icelandic footballer who plays as a midfielder for Breiðablik and the Iceland national team.

Career
Tómasdóttir debuted with the Iceland national team in 2021. While studying in the United States between 2015 and 2018, she played football for Texas Christian University.

References

External links

1995 births
Living people
Women's association football midfielders
Karitas Tómasdóttir
Karitas Tómasdóttir
Selfoss women's football players
Breiðablik women's football players
TCU Horned Frogs women's soccer players
Úrvalsdeild kvenna (football) players